Abou Qawouq (Arabic: أبو قاووق) is a Syrian village in the Qatana District of the Rif Dimashq Governorate. According to the Syria Central Bureau of Statistics (CBS), Abou Qawouq had a population of 645 in the 2004 census.

References

External links

Populated places in Qatana District